Colin Dettmer (26 September 1958 – 12 January 2010) was a South African cricketer who played in twenty-one first-class and twelve List A matches between 1991 and 1995. He committed suicide at the age of 51.

References

External links
 

1958 births
2010 suicides
South African cricketers
Boland cricketers
North West cricketers
Cricketers from Cape Town
Suicides by firearm in South Africa